Kauko Kalevi Kangasniemi (18 November 1942 – 17 April 2013) was a Finnish heavyweight weightlifter. He competed in the 1968 and 1972 Summer Olympics and placed seventh on both occasions. Between 1969 and 1972 he won three medals at the world and European championships and set five world records in the snatch.

Kangasniemi was born to a blacksmith and had seven brothers and three sisters. Four of his brothers were Finnish champions in weightlifting, and one, Kaarlo, was a world and Olympic champion. The Kangasniemi brothers had a rivalry at the national championships with the four Kailajärvi brothers.

References

1942 births
2013 deaths
People from Ulvila
Finnish male weightlifters
Olympic weightlifters of Finland
Weightlifters at the 1972 Summer Olympics
European Weightlifting Championships medalists
World Weightlifting Championships medalists
Sportspeople from Satakunta
20th-century Finnish people
21st-century Finnish people